Giovanni Battista Rabino (15 December 1931 – 12 March 2020) was an Italian politician from the Christian Democracy party who served as member of the Chamber of Deputies from 1983 to 1992, then a single term, between 1992 and 1994, as Senator.

Biography
He was born in Montaldo Scarampi, and served as mayor of the city between 2004 and 2009. Before his political career, Rabino was a trade unionist, active in Alessandria's  branch. 

Rabino died from COVID-19 at the Cardinal Massaja Hospital in Asti on 12 March 2020. His funeral was held two days later.

References

1931 births
2020 deaths
People from the Province of Asti
21st-century Italian politicians
Deaths from the COVID-19 pandemic in Piedmont
Deputies of Legislature IX of Italy
Deputies of Legislature X of Italy
Senators of Legislature XI of Italy
Christian Democracy (Italy) members of the Chamber of Deputies (Italy)
Italian trade unionists
Mayors of places in Piedmont